CUMYL-FUBINACA (SGT-149) is an indazole-3-carboxamide based synthetic cannabinoid receptor agonist, with an EC50 of 1.8nM for human CB1 receptors and 23.7nM for human CB2 receptors, giving it around 13x selectivity for CB1. It has been sold online as a designer drug.

See also 
 AB-FUBINACA
 CUMYL-PINACA
 CUMYL-CBMINACA
 CUMYL-THPINACA
 MDMB-FUBINACA

References 

Cannabinoids
Designer drugs
Indazolecarboxamides
Fluoroarenes